Khan Shaheb Osman Ali Stadium is a cricket stadium located in Fatullah, Narayanganj in central Bangladesh. It has a capacity of around 25,000 people and field dimensions of 181m X 145 m.

History 
The ground was used in 2004 for matches of the ICC Under-19 Cricket World Cup.

The stadium became a Test cricket venue on 9 April 2006, when it hosted a Test match between Australia and Bangladesh.

The stadium hosted two warm-up matches of 2011 Cricket World Cup. England played both warm-up matches against Canada and Pakistan respectively. The venue hosted the first round matches of 2014 Asia Cup. In Asia Cup 2014, Bangladesh became the first test playing nation to lose an ODI against Afghanistan, where Bangladesh lost to Afghanistan by 32 runs.

The was also nominated as a practice match venue for 2014 ICC World Twenty20.
In February 2016, The venue hosted four matches of 2016 Asia Cup Qualifier, of which the match played between Afghanistan and United Arab Emirates was the first Twenty20 International (T20I) match played at this venue.

The venue hosted its second test since its inauguration in 2006 when Indian cricket team toured Bangladesh in June 2015.

The venue has also hosted group stage matches of 2016 Under-19 Cricket World Cup matches.

Outer Ground
The smaller ground next to Fatullah Osmani Stadium, the Khan Shaheb Osmani Ali Stadium Outer Ground, has been used for domestic first-class, List A and T20 cricket since 2013–14. The outer ground was first used for the 2016 Asia Cup Twenty20 International tournament qualifying round. The first match of the ground was held between Afghanistan and UAE on 19 February 2016.

See also
List of Test cricket grounds
List of stadiums in Asia
2011 Cricket World Cup
Stadiums in Bangladesh

References

External links
 Khan Shaheb Osmani Ali Stadium, Fatullah at CricketArchive 
 Khan Shaheb Osman Ali Stadium Outer Ground, Fatullah at CricketArchive

Sport in Narayanganj
Cricket grounds in Bangladesh
Test cricket grounds in Bangladesh